Holy Cross Church, Września (pl. Kościół Świętego Krzyża we Wrześni) - is a wooden church (to 1966 likes chapel) in the north-western part of Września, Poland, located in the Lipówka district, on Świętokrzyska street, next to the storage reservoir Wrześnica. The church is registered as a protected monument Greater Poland Voivodeship -  No. 2293/A (December 8, 1993).

History and building description
Funded by Września's rectors in the 17th century, the Holy Cross Church was the first chapel to be built in the Lipówka district. The church's founding is pertinently connected to a nearby spring and is regarded as miraculous.

Images

Notes and references 

  Krzysztof Jodłowski: Zabytki Wrześni. [w:] Marian Torzewski (red.): Września. Historia miasta. Muzeum Regionalne im. Dzieci Wrzesińskich we Wrześni, Września, 2006, s. 430-431

External links 
  Information on the Holy Cross Church, Września

Wrzesnia, Holy Cross Church
Września